The Kingdoms of Kalamar is a fantasy role-playing game campaign setting published by Kenzer & Company in 1994 that is compatible with the second edition of Advanced Dungeons & Dragons published by TSR.

Contents
The Kingdoms of Kalamar describes the Kingdoms of Kalamar on the planet Tellene, providing details of its inhabitants, flora and fauna, geography, religions, and nations.  Because Kenzer & Co. did not have a license to produce material for TSR games, the book was advertised as a generic setting that could be adapted to any role-playing game system. However a note on the back cover of the original edition clarified that the setting was "suitable for use with Advanced Dungeons & Dragons" with a disclaimer "Advanced Dungeons & Dragons is a registered trademark of TSR Hobbies, Inc. Use of this trademark is NOT sanctioned by the holder."

The material was originally published as two books:
Volume 1: Sourcebook of the Sovereign Lands detailed the people and places of Tellene, the campaign's continent (and world). It broke the continent down into six regions and examined each one on a large scale.
Volume 2: Mythos of the Divine and Worldly detailed the setting's 43 gods. It also described the setting's secret societies, astrology and calendar.
These products could also be purchased together in a boxed set titled The Kingdoms of Kalamar that included a two-part map.

Publication history
When David Kenzer and his friends Brian Jelke and Steve Johansson decided to start the game company Kenzer & Company in 1994, their first project was The Kingdoms of Kalamar, a fantasy world designed to be compatible with the second edition of AD&D. The company produced a couple of more expansions for The Kingdoms of Kalamar in 1997, then after shutting down for two years, returned with what Shannon Appelcline called "a set of cheap and small Kalamar Quest adventures (1999–2000)."

Reception
In the December 1996 edition of Dragon (Issue #236), Rick Swan especially liked the religion section, and called the color maps "lush". Swan concluded with a recommendation to buy, saying, "the mountain of campaign fodder should be enough to keep your players busy until they're ready for the rest home."

In the 2014 book Designers & Dragons: The '90s, game historian Shannon Appelcline noted that "Though small press, [Kalamar] was lauded for its colorful maps and its attention to details — making it in some ways like a more fantasy-oriented version of Columbia Games' classic Hârn."

Other reviews
Shadis #16
d8 Magazine Issue 1 (1995, p. 66)
The Guild Companion (December 2001)
Legions Realm Monthly Issue 5 (January 2003, p. 1)

References

Fantasy role-playing game supplements
Role-playing game supplements introduced in 1994